"Higher" is a song by West Coast rapper the Game, released as the fourth single from his debut album The Documentary exclusively in France on March 7, 2005.

Composition
In the song, rapper Dr. Dre tells listeners to "Look out for Detox", which at the time was his anticipated third studio album. Now, over ten years after the song's release, Detox has yet to be released. Dr. Dre has since scrapped Detox, instead releasing Compton: A Soundtrack.

Chart performance
Having received a single release in France, the song debuted at number forty-seven on the country's national singles chart. Although "Higher" was not officially released in the United States, it peaked at number eight on the US Bubbling Under R&B/Hip-Hop Singles chart based on airplay.

References

2005 songs
2005 singles
The Game (rapper) songs
Songs written by Dr. Dre
Songs written by Mark Batson
Songs written by Mike Elizondo
Songs written by 50 Cent
Song recordings produced by Dr. Dre
Gangsta rap songs
Songs written by The Game (rapper)